Thisizima bovina is a moth of the family Tineidae. It is found on the Andaman Islands.

References

Moths described in 1928
Tineidae